Cabirus is a genus of skippers in the family Hesperiidae. It is monotypic, being represented by the single species Cabirus procas.

References

Natural History Museum Lepidoptera genus database

Hesperiidae
Hesperiidae genera
Taxa named by Jacob Hübner